The China national beach soccer team represents People's Republic of China in international beach soccer competition.

Roster 
Correct as of July 2012

Coach: Ross Ongaro

Tournament

FIFA Beach Soccer World Cup
 1995 to 2005 – Did not enter
 2006 to 2019 – Did not qualify

AFC Beach Soccer Championship

Asian Beach Games

BSWW Mundialito

Reference

External links
Chinese Football Association Official Website 
 Team China Official Website 
Profile on FIFA 
Profile on AFC

Asian national beach soccer teams
Football in China
Football, Beach soccer